Faisal Mahmud is a Bangladeshi footballer who plays as a midfielder. He currently plays for Brothers Union.

Honours

Bangladesh
 SAFF Championship: 2003

References

Living people
1983 births
Bangladeshi footballers
Bangladesh international footballers
Association football midfielders
Brothers Union players
Abahani Limited (Dhaka) players
Mohammedan SC (Dhaka) players
Sheikh Jamal Dhanmondi Club players
Bangladesh Football Premier League players
Footballers at the 2002 Asian Games
Footballers at the 2006 Asian Games
Asian Games competitors for Bangladesh